Phayao is a city (thesaban mueang) in northern Thailand, capital of Phayao Province.  For administrative purposes the city is divided into 15 sub-districts (tambons), which are further subdivided into 172 administrative villages.

The town is on the shore of the Phayao Lake. It dates back to the semi-independent city-state (mueang), founded between 900 and 1,000 years ago.

As of 2005 Phayao had a population of 19,118. Phayao lies 726 km north of Bangkok.

Climate

References

External links

Populated places in Phayao province
Cities and towns in Thailand